Yehor Yevhenovych "Egor" Shastin (born September 10, 1982) is a Ukrainian-Russian professional ice hockey player who is currently playing for Torpedo Nizhny Novgorod in the Kontinental Hockey League (KHL). He was selected by Calgary Flames in the 4th round (124th overall) of the 2001 NHL Entry Draft.

Career statistics

Regular season and playoffs

International

External links

Living people
Sportspeople from Kyiv
Torpedo Nizhny Novgorod players
Calgary Flames draft picks
1982 births
Ukrainian ice hockey forwards